Allen v. United States is the name of four different cases heard by the Supreme Court of the United States:
Allen v. United States 
Allen v. United States 
Allen v. United States , approved the use of a jury instruction ("Allen charge") intended to prevent a hung jury by encouraging jurors in the minority to reconsider
Allen v. United States